Robert Birker (21 February 1885 – 2 August 1942) was a German cyclist. He competed in two events at the 1912 Summer Olympics.

References

External links
 

1885 births
1942 deaths
German male cyclists
Olympic cyclists of Germany
Cyclists at the 1912 Summer Olympics
Cyclists from North Rhine-Westphalia
People from Rheinisch-Bergischer Kreis
Sportspeople from Cologne (region)